These are lists of radio stations in Manawatū-Whanganui in New Zealand.

Palmerston North stations
Stations broadcasting from these transmitters also serve much of the southern half of the region, including the towns of Marton, Feilding, Levin, Foxton, Dannevirke and Pahiatua.

Whanganui Stations

Stations in Manawatū-Whanganui outside of Palmerston North and Whanganui

References

Manawatu-Whanganui
Manawatū-Whanganui